The facekini is a mask designed for swimmers and beachgoers which covers the head and reveals only the eyes, nose, and mouth. It was invented by Zhang Shifan in 2004, a former accountant from the coastal Chinese city of Qingdao which became the hometown of this fashion trend.

The mask is popular in Qingdao, where it is used by people for protecting themselves from tan-inducing ultraviolet rays while in direct sunlight and from jellyfish, insects and other irritants while at the beach. The mask is made of a stretchy fabric that is commonly used in bathing suits, and comes in different colors and patterns. They are often worn in combination with various sun protecting clothing such as body suits with long sleeves, sunglasses, visors, or umbrellas.

The facekini hit the Western press and attention in 2012, and its creator Zhang Shifan has also focused on the development of high-fashion masks. In 2019, its creator launched new models that cover the whole body, not just the face and neck.

A standard model costs $2-4, while fancier models are $16-24. In 2014, the fashion magazine CR Fashion Book published several sets of photos with models wearing facekinis paired with fashionable Alexander Wang and Michael Kors swimwear and jewellery.

See also 

 Balaclava (clothing)
 Anti-flash gear
 Burkini

References

External links
 

Headgear
Chinese inventions
Protective gear
Qingdao
Sports masks